Presdales School is a girls' secondary school with academy status, located in Ware, Hertfordshire in the East of England. The school also operates a coeducational sixth form. The current headmaster is Mr M Warren, who took the post in 2016.

History
It was founded as Ware Grammar School for girls in 1906 at nearby Amwell House, and moved to its present site of Presdales House in 1964. It became a comprehensive in 1975.

It was awarded specialist college status three times by the Secretary of State for Education and Skills, namely as: a Language College, in 1995; an English and Music College, in 2003; and as a Mathematics & Computing College, in 2009. The school converted to academy status in April 2012.

Presdales made the news in December 2020 when its plan to switch to remote learning for the last week of the autumn term was thwarted by Schools Minister, Nick Gibb, who threatened to use legal powers to make the school stay open. The intention had been to keep staff and students isolated and safe from the ongoing Coronavirus pandemic ahead of Christmas.

Notable former pupils
 Kacey Ainsworth, actress who played Little Mo Mitchell from 2000-06 in EastEnders
 Nicola Fibbens, Olympic swimmer, who competed in the 1984 Summer Olympics
 Hannah Fry, mathematician and broadcaster
 Jane Gandee, Headmistress since 2010 of St Swithun's School, Winchester
 Bianca Gascoigne,  British glamour model and television personality
Grace Harvey, British paralympian who won silver in the 2020 Tokyo games

Ware Grammar School for Girls
 Tessa Blackstone, Baroness Blackstone
 Ann Dummett (née Chesney), Director from 1984-87 of the Runnymede Trust
 Kim Wilde, 1980s singer and DJ

References

External links
 Presdales School official website

Secondary schools in Hertfordshire
Girls' schools in Hertfordshire
Educational institutions established in 1906
1906 establishments in England
Academies in Hertfordshire
Ware, Hertfordshire